Zeyne is a town in Mersin Province, Turkey

Geography 
The population was 1721 as of 2012.

History 
History of Zeyne is intermingled with that of Gülnar. During the Middle Ages it was a part of the Karamanid beylik (principality). After the Karamanids were defeated by the Ottoman Empire it was incorporated into the Ottoman realm in the 15th century. In 1972 the location was renamed as Sütlüce and declared to be a township. The new name was not widely accepted and the government decided to return to the former name in 2007 

Sheik Ali Semerkandi (Ali of Semerkand) is an important figure of Zeyne history. He was a Muslim religious leader in Semerkand (modern Uzbekistan) According to legend, he travelled to Anatolia and settled in Zeyne in 1434. He stayed in Zeyne and Karaman for the rest of his life and died in Zeyne in 1457.  A mosque had been built next to his tomb in Zeyne. There is a spring just east of the town where very old monumental trees have been grown.  According to mythology that spring was created by Ali Semarkandi.

Economy 
The town is a typical agricultural town. Olives and various fruits like apricots, figs and grapes are produced. Dairying is also an important economic activity.

References 

Populated places in Mersin Province
Towns in Turkey
Populated places in Gülnar District